Micott & Basara was a Japanese film production and film distributor company.

Movies
Appleseed (2004)
Appleseed: Ex Machina (2007)
Appleseed XIII (2011)

Bankruptcy
On April 21, 2011, Teikoku Databank reported that Micott & Basara filed for voluntary bankruptcy at the Tokyo District Court after incurring 1.938 billion yen of debt at the end of March.

References

Appleseed (media franchise)
Film production companies of Japan